Andrew Morkel (4 August 1882 –  14 June 1965) was a South African international rugby union player who played as a wing.

He made 1 appearance for South Africa against the British Lions in 1903.

References

South African rugby union players
South Africa international rugby union players
1882 births
1965 deaths
Rugby union wings